Ulm Minster is a Lutheran church located in Ulm, State of Baden-Württemberg (Germany). It is currently the tallest church in the world. The church is the fifth-tallest structure built before the 20th century, with a steeple measuring 161.53 metres.

Though it is sometimes referred to as Ulm Cathedral because of its great size, the church is not a cathedral as it has never been the episcopal see of a bishop. Though the towers and all decorative elements are of stone masonry, attracting the attention of visitors, most of the walls, including the façades of the nave and choir, actually consist of visible brick. Therefore, the building is sometimes referred to as a brick church. As such, it lays claim to the rank of second- to fourth-largest, after San Petronio Basilica in Bologna and together with Frauenkirche in Munich and St. Mary's Church in Gdańsk. The tower however was mainly built from sandstone.

Ulm Minster was begun in the Gothic architecture of the Late Middle Ages but the building was not completed until the late 19th century after a hiatus of centuries. When work ceased in the 16th century all of the church except the towers and some outer decorations were complete, unlike at Cologne Cathedral, where less than half of the work had been done before construction halted in the 15th century.

Visitors can climb the 768 steps that lead to the top of the minster's spire. At  it gives a panoramic view of Ulm in Baden-Württemberg and Neu-Ulm in Bavaria and, in clear weather, a vista of the Alps from Säntis to the Zugspitze. The final stairwell to the top (known as the third Gallery) is a tall, spiralling staircase that has barely enough room for one person.

History

First construction phase, 1377-1543
The original parish church in Ulm was built at the gate of the city outside the walls, and this caused much trouble for the citizens of the city in the 14th century's conflicts that involved Ulm, as demonstrated by Emperor Charles IV's siege of the city. This parish church had also been subordinated to Reichenau Monastery by Charlemagne in 813, and the denizens of Ulm wanted a new, independent church inside the city's walls. To this end, the city's near 10,000 inhabitants decided to finance construction themselves. On 30 June 1377, Mayor Ludwig Krafft laid the first stone, the foundation stone, of the new church. This church, whose design would be given to Heinrich Parler, the architect of Holy Cross Minster in Schwäbisch Gmünd. The women of the Ulmer Assemblage would also make their contributions to the foundation works, something memorialized by 17th and 18th century composer Barbara Kluntz.

Michael Parler, who had experience from working at the Dombauhütte in Prague, assumed construction of the church in 1381 and continued work on the nave, which had originally been conceived as a triple-aisled hall church with approximately equal height and width. From 1387 to 1391, Heinrich III Parler managed construction as head of the Bauhütte. Then in 1392 Ulrich Ensingen, associated with Strasbourg Cathedral, was appointed master builder. It was Parler's plan to construct the Ulm Minster's  spire, the highest of any church. In order to balance its proportions, the nave was now to be much taller than the Parlers had intended, making a noticeable difference in height between the chancel and nave. The church was consecrated on 25 July 1405. In 1446, Ulrich's son Matthäus took over construction and finished the choir vault in 1449 and the vault over the northern nave in 1452. When he died in 1463, his own son, Mortiz, took over construction. Himself dying in 1471, he completed the vaulting over the nave and constructed the sacrament house, finally making the church a basilica according to Ulrich's plan.

In 1477, Matthäus Böblinger took over and made changes to the plans of the church but especially to the main tower and in doing so caused the church's first major structural threat: the heavy vaults of the wide aisles and high nave burdened the columns with too much lateral force at different heights. A new master builder, Burkhart Engelberg of Augsburg, tackled the structural damage by reinforcing the foundation of the west tower and demolishing the heavy aisle vaults and replacing them with vaults of half widths, which afforded rows of additional columns dividing each of the aisles in two. Although catastrophe had been avoided, the walls were left without their buttresses for 350 years and the northern wall of the nave bulges outward by  even today.

In a referendum in 1530/31, the citizens of Ulm converted to Protestantism during the Reformation. Ulm Minster became a Lutheran church. Despite its vast size, it is not a cathedral, as the responsible bishop of the Evangelical-Lutheran Church in Württemberg – member of the Evangelical Church in Germany – resides in Stuttgart.

The suspension of the building process was due to a variety of factors which were political and religious, like the Reformation, as well as economic, since the discovery of the Americas during the voyages of Christopher Columbus 1492–1504, the Portuguese discovery of the sea route to India in 1497–99, and Magellan's circumnavigation of the globe led to an epochal shift in trade routes and commodities. One result was economic stagnation and a steady decline, preventing major public expenditure.

Resumption and completion of construction, 1844-1890 
In 1817, the interior frescos were covered by painting the walls grey. In 1844, construction work resumed. After a phase of repairs lasting until 1856, the central nave was stabilized by the addition of flying buttresses. Then the small steeples beside the choir were built – without medieval plans. At last, the main steeple was completed, changing the available medieval plan in making it about ten metres taller. Finally, on 31 May 1890 the building was completed.

World War II

A devastating air raid hit Ulm on 17 December 1944, which destroyed virtually the entire town west of the church to the railway station and north of the church to the outskirts. The church itself was barely damaged. However, almost all the other buildings of the town square (Münsterplatz) were severely hit and some 80% of the medieval centre of Ulm was destroyed.

Current events
The church is currently dealing with problems caused by large numbers of men and women urinating around the structure.  In addition to the health issues this presents, acids and salts in the urine are degrading the sandstone foundation of the Münster. Church officials say that festivals and events in the adjacent Münsterplatz draw large numbers of people to the area, but event organizers do not provide sufficient free toilets. After costly repairs to the structure, church leaders pressed city officials to increase patrols and fines, but these have failed to stop offenders.

Architecture
While the walls of the choir, the side aisles and the tower were constructed of brick, the upper levels of the nave are ashlar, using sandstone from Isny im Allgäu. Limestone from the nearby Swabian Jura was used in small quantities.

Works of art
 Late medieval sculptures include the tympanum of the main Western entrance depicts scenes from the Genesis. The central column bears a sculpture, the Man of Sorrows, by the local master Hans Multscher.
 The 15th century choir stalls by Jörg Syrlin the Elder, made from oak and adorned with hundreds of carved busts are among the most famous pews of the Gothic period.
 The pulpit canopy is by Jörg Syrlin the Younger.
 The original high altar was destroyed by the iconoclasts of the Reformation. The current altarpiece from the early 16th century is a triptych, showing figures of the Holy Family and the Last Supper in the predella.
 The five stained glass windows of the apse, which is in the form of half a decagon, show Biblical scenes and date to the 14th and 15th century.
The main organ of the church was destroyed by iconoclasts and replaced in the late 16th century. Wolfgang Amadeus Mozart is known to have played it in 1763. For some decades it was the largest organ in existence. In the late 1960s it was reconstructed to solve acoustic problems of reverberation.
In 1877, the Jewish congregation of the synagogue of Ulm—including Hermann Einstein, the father of Albert Einstein—donated money for a statue of the Biblical prophet Jeremiah. The figure was placed below the main organ.
Later renovations in the modern era added gargoyles and a sculpture, The Beggar, by the expressionist Ernst Barlach.

Bells
The tower contains 13 bells in total and only 10 of the 13 swing. 6 bells in including the largest bell, Gloriosa were cast by Heinrich Kurtz in Stuttgart 1956. Leichenglocke is responsible to chime the quarter-hours and the second largest bell Dominica chimes the hours.

Plan

Measurements
Ulm Münster is the world's tallest church
The church seats a congregation of 2,000.
In the Middle Ages, before pews were introduced, it could accommodate 20,000 people, when the population of the town was about 5,000.

Gallery

See also
 Gothic cathedrals and churches
 Strasbourg Cathedral
 Cologne Cathedral
 Gothic architecture
 Protestant Reformation
 List of tallest structures built before the 20th century

References

External links

  Official Website
  
 

Former world's tallest buildings
Roman Catholic churches completed in 1890
Landmarks in Germany
Buildings and structures in Ulm
Gothic architecture in Germany
Lutheran churches converted from Roman Catholicism
Churches of the Evangelical-Lutheran Church in Württemberg
Sandstone churches
1890 establishments in Germany